The 2017–18 season was the 121st season of competitive football in Scotland. The domestic season began on 15 July 2017, with the first round of matches in the 2017–18 Scottish League Cup. The 2017–18 Scottish Professional Football League season commenced on 5 August.

Transfer deals

League competitions

Scottish Premiership

Scottish Championship

Scottish League One

Scottish League Two

Non-league football

Level 5

Level 6

SPFL Development League

Development League Champions

Honours

Cup honours

Non-league honours

Senior

Junior
West Region

East Region

North Region

Individual honours

PFA Scotland awards

SFWA awards

SPFL awards

Scottish clubs in Europe

Summary
Celtic, Aberdeen, Rangers and St Johnstone qualified for European competition. Rangers and St Johnstone were both eliminated in the first qualifying round, which prompted some administrators and coaches to suggest that Scottish football should adopt a summer season.

Celtic
UEFA Champions League

Celtic started in the second qualifying round of the 2017–18 UEFA Champions League, and were drawn against the winners of a first round tie between Linfield and Fiorita.

UEFA Europa League
Celtic finished third in their Champions League group, which meant that they progressed to the last 32 of the Europa League.

Aberdeen
UEFA Europa League
Aberdeen started in the second qualifying round of the 2017–18 UEFA Europa League, and were drawn against the winners of a first round tie between Ordabasy and Široki Brijeg.

Rangers
UEFA Europa League

St Johnstone
UEFA Europa League

Scotland national team

Women's football

League and Cup honours

Individual honours

SWPL awards

Scottish Women's Premier League

UEFA Women's Champions League

Glasgow City
Glasgow City entered the Champions League in the round of 32.

Hibernian

Scotland women's national team

Deaths

2 July: Billy Cook, 77, Kilmarnock defender.
2 July: John McCormick, 80, Third Lanark and Aberdeen defender.
5 July: John McKenzie, 91, Partick Thistle, Dumbarton and Scotland winger.
15 July: Davie Laing, 92, Heart of Midlothian, Clyde and Hibernian wing half.
19 July: Joe Walters, 82, Clyde, Albion Rovers and Stenhousemuir wing half.
2 August: Dave Caldwell, 85, Aberdeen and Morton left back.
15 August: Joe McGurn, 52, St Johnstone, Alloa and Stenhousemuir forward.
16 August: John Ogston, 78, Aberdeen goalkeeper.
12 September: Bert McCann, 84, Dundee United, Queen's Park, Motherwell, Hamilton and Scotland wing half.
18 September: Paul Wilson, 66, Celtic, Motherwell and Partick Thistle midfielder.
1 October: John Swinburne, 87, Motherwell director.
6 October: Ian McNeill, 85, Aberdeen forward and Ross County manager.
9 October: Jimmy Reid, 81, Dundee United, East Fife, Arbroath and Brechin City forward.
31 October: Stefano Salvatori, 49, Hearts midfielder.
15 November: Bert Ormond, 86, Falkirk, Airdrieonians and Dumbarton forward.
28 November: Jimmy McEwan, 88, Arbroath and Raith Rovers winger.
26 December: Willie Penman, 78, Rangers inside forward.
2 January: Mike McCartney, 63, Gretna manager.
2 January: Felix Reilly, 84, Dunfermline and East Fife forward.
9 January: Tommy Lawrence, 77, Scotland goalkeeper.
10 January: John McGlashan, 50, Montrose, Dundee, Arbroath and Ross County midfielder; Arbroath manager.
9 February: Liam Miller, 36, Celtic and Hibernian midfielder.
19 February: John Orr, 72, Kilmarnock chairman (2001–03).
28 February: John Muir, 70, Alloa Athletic and St Johnstone forward.
4 March: Alex Rennie, 69, Stirling Albion, St Johnstone and Dundee United defender; St Johnstone and Stenhousemuir manager.
6 March: John Kurila, 76, Celtic wing half.
19 March: George Meek, 84, Hamilton winger.
28 March: Ron Mailer, 85, Dunfermline wing half.
4 April: Ray Wilkins, 61, Rangers and Hibernian midfielder.
10 April: John Lambie, 77, Falkirk and St Johnstone defender; Hamilton, Partick Thistle and Falkirk manager.
27 April: George Mulhall, 81, Aberdeen, Morton and Scotland winger.
May: Bill McCarry, 79, Falkirk, St Johnstone and Stirling Albion centre half / centre forward.
28 May: Neale Cooper, 54, Aberdeen, Rangers, Dunfermline and Ross County midfielder; Ross County and Peterhead manager.
2 June: John Ritchie, 70, Cowdenbeath, Brechin City and Dundee United goalkeeper; Brechin City manager.
14 June: Allan Presslie, 77, Caledonian, Arbroath, Buckie Thistle and Elgin City centre half.
21 June: Johnny Hubbard, 87, Rangers and Ayr United winger.
23 June: Douglas Rae, 87, Morton chairman.
26 June: Harold Davis, 85, East Fife, Rangers and Partick Thistle wing half; Queen's Park and Queen of the South manager.
c.26 June: Ronnie Sheed, 71, Kilmarnock and Partick Thistle midfielder.

Notes and references

 
Seasons in Scottish football
S
S